Dialium orientale is a species of plant in the family Fabaceae.It is found in Kenya, Somalia, and Tanzania. The fruit of this tree is a popular snack in Kenya and known as pepeta. It is threatened by habitat loss.

References

JSTOR Global Plants

orientale
Flora of Kenya
Flora of Somalia
Flora of Tanzania
Near threatened flora of Africa
Taxonomy articles created by Polbot